Coleophora juncicolella is a moth of the family Coleophoridae. It is found from Fennoscandia to the Mediterranean Sea and from Ireland to Poland and Hungary.

Description
Adults are grey-white. The head is ochreous-grey. The antennae grey- whitish, ringed with dark grey. Forewings shining grey, ochreous-tinged. Hindwings grey.. They are on wing from late June to July in western Europe.

The larvae feed on common heather (Calluna vulgaris) and bell heather (Erica cinerea). The case is composed of 8-10 small leaf fragments. Full-grown larvae can be found from March to May.

References

External links
 

juncicolella
Moths described in 1851
Moths of Europe
Taxa named by Henry Tibbats Stainton